La viuda de Blanco (double meaning: Blanco's Widow and The Widow in White) is an American telenovela that aired on Telemundo from July 24, 2006 to March 2, 2007. It is based on the 1996 Colombian telenovela of the same name. It stars Itatí Cantoral, Francisco Gattorno, Zully Montero, and Alejandro Felipe.

Plot 
A mysterious woman (Amador Blanco's wife) arrives in the town of Trinidad looking for her past. After years of imprisonment for a crime she did not commit, the beautiful widow Alicia Guardiola returns to claim her twin boys, who are being raised by their grandmother, the feared and respected Perfecta Albarracin. Perfecta has no intention of giving up her grandchildren without a fight, and enlists her son, the handsome Sebastian Blanco, to help her. On opposite sides of a battle to claim two precocious boys who share dreams and magical powers, Alicia and Sebastian find themselves falling in love, without even suspecting the dark consequences a relationship between them will bring.

The main conflict is Alicia's desire to get custody of her twins back.  Since Alicia was put in prison for murdering her husband Amador, son of Perfecta, Perfecta got custody of Alicia's children.  The story starts with Alicia just having been declared innocent of murder and released from prison.  But while that is the main conflict, another conflict exists which the audience does not pay much attention to, namely how Perfecta is alienating her children by her drive to dominate them with an unforgiving spirit if they appear in her eyes to have done wrong or offended her.  A crisis comes in this conflict as Perfecta realizes her error and speeds in a car to try to reach her daughter Haydee, who is leaving the country.  But just before Perfecta's car catches up with Haydee's car, Haydee dies in a car crash.  Eventually the audience learns that actually it is Perfecta who is the real viuda de Blanco, not Alicia!  For Alicia had never been married to Perfecta's son, a scoundrel who tricked Alicia with a fake marriage using a fake priest.  Moreover, we learn that Amador never died; that too was a fake death.

The story embodies a lot of comedy and repetition.  The audience hears about what happened through minor characters or reported to others over the phone.  The comedy comes to a screeching halt with the tragic death of Haydee.  The moral of the story is to treat your children well before death makes that impossible.

Cast

Main 
 Itatí Cantoral as Alicia Guardiola
 Francisco Gattorno as Sebastian Blanco Albarracín
 Zully Montero as Doña Perfecta Albarracín vda. de Blanco
 Alejandro Felipe as Felipe and Duván Blanco Guardiola

Recurring 
 Zharick León as Illuminada Urbina
 Lilibeth Morillo as Haydée Blanco Albarracín
 Flavio Caballero as Justino Briñón
 Jeannette Lehr as Professor Judith Cuestas
 Eduardo Ibarrola as Laurentino Urbina
 Rodolfo Jiménez as Comandante Pablo Ríos
 Manuel Balbi as Megateo
 Michelle Vargas as Valeria Sandoval
 Alfonso Diluca as Hipólto Reboyo
 Nury Flores as Blasina
 Pedro Moreno as Querubín
 Marcela Serna as Clarita
 Martha Pabón as Ofelia

Guest 
 Carlos Camacho as Dimas Pantoja
 Martín Karpan as Amador Blanco Albarracín
 Renato Rossini as Fabio Huster
 Renato Lamborghini as Segundo Extra

External links
 
 Telemundo International La Viuda de Blanco page (English, requires Flash)

2006 telenovelas
2006 Colombian television series debuts
2007 Colombian television series endings
2006 American television series debuts
2007 American television series endings
Colombian telenovelas
American telenovelas
Spanish-language American telenovelas
Caracol Televisión telenovelas
Telemundo telenovelas
American television series based on Colombian television series